The Little Auglaize River is a  tributary of the Auglaize River in northwest Ohio in the United States. It drains a primarily rural farming area in the watershed of Lake Erie.

It flows northeast past Middle Point. Near Ottoville in western Putnam County it turns north-northwest for its lower  and joins the Auglaize from the south near Melrose in eastern Paulding County.

See also
List of rivers of Ohio

References

Rivers of Ohio
Rivers of Van Wert County, Ohio
Rivers of Putnam County, Ohio
Rivers of Paulding County, Ohio
Tributaries of Lake Erie